The 2012 Asian Development Tour was the third season of the Asian Development Tour, a second-tier tour operated by the Asian Tour.

Schedule
The following table lists official events during the 2012 season.

Order of Merit
The Order of Merit was based on prize money won during the season, calculated in U.S. dollars. The top three players on the tour earned status to play on the 2013 Asian Tour.

Notes

References

Asian Development Tour
Asian Development Tour